Die Rote Fahne (The Red Flag) was a German newspaper originally founded in 1876 by Socialist Worker's Party leader Wilhelm Hasselmann, and which has been since published on and off, at times underground, by German Socialists and Communists. Karl Liebknecht and Rosa Luxemburg famously published it in 1918 as organ of the Spartacus League.

Following the deaths of Liebknecht and Luxemburg during the chancellorship of the Social Democratic Party of Germany's Friedrich Ebert, the newspaper was published, with interruptions, by the Communist Party of Germany.  Proscribed by the National Socialist Worker's Party government of Adolf Hitler after 1933, publication continued illegally, underground.

History

1876
Wilhelm Hasselmann of the Socialist Workers' Party of Germany and member of the German Reichstag founded a short-lived, weekly newspaper called Die rote Fahne.

1918–1933
 Using the newspaper's subtitle as indicator of its political allegiance, Die Rote Fahne was successively the central organ of:
 Spartacus League: 9 November 1918 to 30 December 1918
 Communist Party of Germany: 1 January 1919 to 19 September 1920 (reflecting the KPD's submission to the Comintern on
 Communist Party of Germany: 19 September 1920 to roughly 23 March 1933 (date of passage of the Nazi Enabling Act

The publication was proscribed from October 1923 to March 1924, as part of the ban on the German Communist Party. The newspaper continued in illegal production and distribution, sometimes renamed "Rote Sturmfahne" ("Red Storm Flag") or "Die Fahne der Revolution" ("The Flag of the Revolution").  In 1926, the newspaper moved into the Karl Liebknecht House, to which it added in July 1928 a rotary press.  On 23 February 1933, Nazi police occupied Karl-Liebknecht-Haus and closed it the following day, anticipating the Nazi ban on all communist and socialist press after the Reichstag fire a few days later (28 February 1933).

Many prominent Germans and others worked on the newspaper:
 Founders included: Rosa Luxemburg, Karl Liebknecht, Paul Frölich
 Publishers included: Hans Marchwitza and Johannes R. Becher
 Editors included: Ernst Meyer (1918–1919), August Thalheimer (1919–?), Julian Gumperz (1920? – later, second husband of Hede Massing), Werner Scholem (1920--?), Gerhart Eisler (1921–?? already, first husband of Hede Massing), Arkadi Maslow (1921-?), Heinz Neumann (1922–1928?), Max Matern (1925-?), Hans Lorbeer (1928--?), Erika Heymann (1930–1933), Albert Norden (1930–1933), Lutz Łask (1930s and husband of Franz Kafka's lover Dora Diamant), Franz Koritschoner, György Lukács, Wolfgang Harich 
 Contributors included: Emil Barth (1918?), Lilly Becher (1921–?), Willi Schlamm (1923–?), Albert Hotopp (1923-1926), Hanns Eisler (1927), Erich Mielke (1928-1931), John Sieg (1928–1933?), Jürgen Kuczynski (1930–1933), Max Zimmering (1935–1938?), Thomas Ring
 Artists included: John Heartfield

1933–1942
Outlawed after the end of the Weimar Republic and the Reichstag fire in 1933, it was illegally distributed during the National Socialist government by underground groups close to the Communist Party until 1942. Wilhelm Guddorf was known to have been an editor of the newspaper in the late 1930s.

1970 and afterwards
Following the events of 1968, several projects of ideologically divergent groups of the so-called old and the new left arose in the Federal German Republic to build a new communist party. In addition to the  German Communist Party (DKP), which is widely known as the West German KPD successor party and publishes the newspaper Unser Zeit as a party organ , various competing small communist parties , the so-called K groups, were founded, each of which was associated with different ideological concepts of communism (from Maoism to Stalinism to Trotskyism). Out of these groupings, there were several newspaper projects in the 1970s called Rote Fahne.

The Communist Party of Germany (KPD), a fringe party founded in 1990 by disgruntled members of the Socialist Unity Party of Germany, publishes its own version of Die Rote Fahne.

References

External sources
 Die rote Fahne  - Staatsbibliothek zu Berlin
 Rote Fahne News
 Rote Fahne Magazine

1918 establishments in Germany
Communism in Germany
Communist newspapers
Defunct newspapers published in Germany
Newspapers published in Berlin
German-language newspapers
German-language communist newspapers
Publications established in 1918
Publications with year of disestablishment missing
Daily newspapers published in Germany